Hypsizygus tessulatus, the beech mushroom, is an edible mushroom native to East Asia. It is cultivated locally in temperate climates in Europe, North America and Australia and sold fresh in super markets.  In nature, these are gilled mushrooms that grow on wood. Most often the mushroom is found on beech trees, hence the common name. Cultivated versions are often small and thin in appearance and popular in many nations across the world.

Two commercial variations, both originating from Japan, are known:

 Buna-shimeji (:ja:ブナシメジ), wild type brown coloration. Known as brown beech mushroom, beech mushroom, brown clamshell mushroom;
 Bunapi-shimeji (:ja:ブナピー) is a white UV-induced mutant of the former, known as white beech mushroom, white clamshell mushroom. The original strain is registered by Hokto Corporation.

This fungus may be confused with Hypsizygus ulmarius, which grows on elm. A radical alternative view based on ITS DNA barcoding is that all members of the genus are the same species.

Morphology

Cooking
Being tough when raw, the Shimeji should be cooked, having a bitter taste when raw which disappears completely upon cooking. The cooked mushroom has a firm, slightly crunchy texture and a nutty flavor. Preparation makes the mushroom easier to digest. It is often eaten with stir-fried foods including wild game and seafood. It is used in soups, stews and sauces. When prepared alone, Shimeji mushrooms can be sautéed as a whole, including the stem or stalk (only the very end cut off), using a higher temperature; or, they can be slow roasted on a low temperature with a small amount of butter or cooking oil. Shimeji is used in soups, nabe and takikomi gohan.

Gallery

See also

List of Japanese ingredients
Medicinal mushrooms
Shimeji

References

External links

 Honshimeji Mushroom, RecipeTips.com. Brown Beech (Buna shimeji), White Beech (Bunapi shimeji), and the Pioppino (Agrocybe aegerita) mushrooms.
Bunashimeji and Bunapi, Hokuto Corporation.

Lyophyllaceae
Edible fungi
Fungi described in 1791
Fungi in cultivation
Taxa named by Jean Baptiste François Pierre Bulliard